The  will be the 34th season of the main competition for under-18 teams in Japan, the 13th after rebranding the competition to the current "Premier League" format, and the 2nd season with 24 clubs participating in the league.

The U-18 team of J1 League club Sagan Tosu are the defending champions. After being the "West" champion, Sagan qualified to the 2022 Premier League Final, in which they played against the "East" champions Kawasaki Frontale. The Saga-based club ended up winning the match by 3-2, earning them the title.

Changes from the previous season
The Premier League/Prince League play-offs gives an opportunity for teams to be promoted from the Prince Leagues (a conglomerate of regional leagues that forms the 2nd division of youth football in Japan). 

On 2022, the number of teams that could make the jump to the top division were from four up to six. Six matches were held to determine the newcomers and/or other relegated teams of the Premier League. 

The two 10th-placed teams in their respective 2022 Premier League divisions participated in the play-offs, while the 11th and 12th-placed teams of each division were directly relegated.

Participating clubs
As usual, the teams were allocated to each division by the JFA based on geographical positions. Yokohama FC U-18s was the only team to be relocated, switching from the East to the West on 2023.

Premier League EAST

Premier League WEST

Calendar
Matches will be played every week from 1 April to 28 May, when the first season break starts. The league resumes on 17 June, before entering on a two-month season break which starts after the 11th matchweek, held from 8 to 9 July. Resuming from 2 September, the league will be played every week until 22 October. After the end of the third and last season break, the league resumes with the final three matchweeks being played in a space of three weeks.

League table

Premier League East

Premier League West

Season statistics
Will be updated as the season starts.

See also

Japan Football Association (JFA)
League
Japanese association football league system
Prince Takamado Cup

References

External links
Official website 

Youth football in Japan